Mirgas District is one of six districts of the province Antonio Raymondi in Peru.

Ethnic groups 
The people in the district are mainly indigenous citizens of Quechua descent. Quechua is the language which the majority of the population (94.12%) learnt to speak in childhood, 5.70% of the residents started speaking using the Spanish language (2007 Peru Census).

References

States and territories established in 1964
Districts of the Antonio Raymondi Province
Districts of the Ancash Region